Major General
Dr. h. c. Eduard Fischer, 1862–1935, With the outbreak of World War I, Bukovina then part of Austro-Hungary was immediately under siege by the Russian armies. Knight of the Maria Theresa Order, was a colonel (later Gendarmerie major general) commanding the Austrian gendarmerie in Bukovina. The north of Bukovina and Czernowitz, the capital, fell within a month.

Meanwhile, in the unoccupied part of southern Bukovina, an armed resistance group was formed under the command of Colonel Eduard Fischer. His army included many volunteers in addition to the gendarmerie forces. The key points of resistance were Gura Humora and Kimpulung. Fischer fended off the enemy forces, and retook the capital, but only for a short time. The Russians occupied Czernowitz once again on November 20, 1914. He is buried in Vienna, in the cemetery Hietzing, in a grave of honour, Group 49, Number 234.

Books
 
  Едуард Фішер. Війна без армії. Моя оборона Буковини проти росіян / Едуард Фішер; пер. з нім., коментарі та епілог Володимира Заполовського. Чернівці: Книги - XXI, 2019.

References 
 Заполовський В. М. Буковина в останній війні Австро-Угорщини. 1914-1918 [Текст] / В. М. Заполовський ; відп. ред. С. Д. Осачук. - Чернівці : Золоті литаври, 2003. - 242с., 21 арк. фотоіл.: фотоіл., карти. - Бібліогр.: с. 206-228.
 Заполовський В. Генерал-майор Едуард Фішер (1862—1935): (біографічна розвідка) // Буковина: історичні та етнографічні студії. Матеріали IV Міжнародної наукової конференції «Кайндлівські читання». — Чернівці: Зелена Буковина, 2007.

 Fischer's memoirs: 
 
 funeral picture in the newspaper "Wiener Bilder"  http://anno.onb.ac.at/cgi-content/anno?apm=0&aid=wrb&datum=19350630&seite=4&zoom=2
grave picture http://www.viennatouristguide.at/Friedhoefe/Hietzing/Ehrengraeber/z_fischer.htm

Jewish military personnel
Austro-Hungarian military personnel of World War I
Austrian knights
Austrian memoirists
Bukovina Jews
Jewish Austrian writers
Austrian police officers
1862 births
1935 deaths
Knights Cross of the Military Order of Maria Theresa